Nasradine Abdi Aptidon (born 5 June 1994) is a Djiboutian footballer who plays as a goalkeeper for Djiboutian club AS Port and the Djibouti national team.

Asylum in France 
In September 2021, Aptidon and two of his Djibouti national team teammates, Bilal Ahmed and Aboubaker Omar, failed to board a connecting flight in Orly Airport, in Paris, France, on their way to play away to Algeria in a 2022 FIFA World Cup qualification match. Aptidon left the airport seven days later, and sought asylum in France alongside his teammates.

In October, Aptidon and Omar applied for asylum in Rennes, and have been granted a 10-month residence permit.

Honours
AS Port
 Djibouti Premier League: 2018–19

References

External links
 
 
 

1994 births
Living people
People from Djibouti (city)
Djiboutian footballers
Association football goalkeepers
AS Arta/Solar7 players
AS Port players
Djibouti Premier League players
Djibouti international footballers